The 2015–16 SPFL Development League was the 18th season of the highest youth Scottish football league and the second season under the "Development League" format. It began in August 2015 and ended in May 2016.

Changes
The league remained at 17 teams. All twelve 2015–16 Scottish Premiership clubs participated in the league, with Dunfermline Athletic, Falkirk, Hibernian, Rangers and St Mirren making up the numbers. Eligible players were those born in 1996 or later, but five players of any age were permitted in the matchday squad of 18.

Development League table

Matches
Teams played each other twice, once at home, once away.

References

External links
SPFL

Development
Development
SPFL Development League